Alba Gaïa Bellugi (born Alba Gaïa Kraghede Bellugi; 5 March 1995) is a French actress of Danish and Italian origin. She is best known for her performance as Elisa in The Intouchables (2011).

Selected filmography

References

External links
 

1995 births
French film actresses
French people of Italian descent
French people of Danish descent
Living people
Actresses from Paris